The 1997 Wallabies Spring Tour was a series of matches played in October and November 1997 in Argentina and the Great Britain by the Australia national rugby union team.

Matches

Summary 
Complete list of matches played by the Wallabies:

 Test matches

Match details 

Argentina: Ezequiel Jurado; Diego Albanese, Eduardo Simone, Fabián Turnes, Diego Giannantonio; Lisandro Arbizu, Agustín Pichot; Pablo Camerlinckx; Miguel Ruiz, Rolando Martín; Alejandro Allub, Pedro Sporleder (captain); Mauricio Reggiardo, Mario Ledesma (Martín Scelzo), Roberto Grau.
Australia: Stephen Larkham (Mítch Hardy); Ben Tune, Tim Horan, Pat Howard, 
Joe Roff; David Knox, George Gregan; Troy Coker (Willie Ofahengaue); Brett Robinson, Owen Finnegan (Willie Ofahengaue); John Eales (captain), Warwick Waugh; Andrew Blades, Michael Foley, Richard Harry.

Argentina: Ezequiel Jurado; Diego Albanese, Eduardo Simone, Fabián Turnes, Diego Giannantonio; Lisandro Arbizu, Agustín Pichot; Pablo Camerlinckx; Miguel Ruiz, Rolando Martín; Alejandro Allub, Pedro Sporleder (captain); Mauricio Reggiardo (Omar Hasan), Mario Ledesma, Roberto Grau.
Australia: Stephen Larkham; Ben Tune, Tim Horan, Pat Howard, Joe Roff; David Knox (Mitch Hardy), George Gregan; Troy Coker (Willie Ofahengaue); Brett Robinson, Owen Finnegan; John Eales (captain), Warwick Waugh; Andrew Blades, Michael Foley, Richard Harry.

Bibliography

References

1997 rugby union tours
tour
1997
1997 in Argentine rugby union
1997–98 in English rugby union
1997–98 in Scottish rugby union
1997
1997
1997
History of rugby union matches between Argentina and Australia
History of rugby union matches between Australia and England